"Who Wants to Be a Millionaire?" is an episode of the BBC sitcom, Only Fools and Horses. It was the final episode of Series 5, and was first screened on 5 October 1986. This is also the last episode to be 30 minutes long with all the subsequent episodes lasting 50 minutes or more. In the episode, Del's old business partner Jumbo Mills returns to Peckham and asks Del to go into business with him in Australia.

Plot
When he enters The Nag's Head for a drink, Del Boy is surprised to see his old school friend and business partner, Jumbo Mills, who emigrated to Australia in 1967, back in Peckham. Before he left, Del had given Jumbo his last £200, and by a way of returning the favour, Jumbo offers Del the chance to renew their old partnership by helping to run his car business back in Australia. Believing his opportunity to become a millionaire has finally arrived, Del accepts the offer. But things soon go awry. First, Albert refuses to leave, having already spent most of his life travelling the world with the Royal Navy and wanting to settle down in Peckham during his retirement. Rodney, too, is unable to go, after his criminal conviction for possession of cannabis results in him being denied an immigration visa.

Regardless, Del is still keen to go, and hands ownership of Trotters Independent Traders over to Rodney. The two have a fierce row, where Rodney accuses Del of interfering when he had opportunities to be a success and using family ties as the excuse, and Del retorts that having to look after Rodney since he was a child after their mother's death had stopped him realising his own dreams. Rodney storms out of the flat in tears, with Del refusing to back down, and Albert completely disgusted by the row.
	
Later that night, Albert suggests to Del that he should go to Australia and become a millionaire while he has the chance, which means Rodney will have to learn to grow up. With his mind made up, Del phones Jumbo to confirm what time he will be arriving. But instead, Del turns down Jumbo's offer, reluctantly admitting he cannot leave his family behind. As Albert goes to bed, Rodney returns home to apologise to Del for the row they had earlier, and to tell his older brother that he needs to go to Australia. But Del tells Rodney he's already turned down the offer. The Trotter brothers then talk about how Rodney was right when he told Del during their earlier argument, "The real opportunity lies here." Britain is in a bad way, people want a good bargain, and they turn to men like the Trotters, who will be there, and this time next year, they will be millionaires. The Trotter brothers make up, Rodney goes to bed happy, and Del secretly laments his lost opportunity for wealth by singing "Who Wants to Be a Millionaire?".

Episode cast

Episode concept
 This was originally planned to be the final Only Fools and Horses episode with Del leaving to go to Australia after David Jason had stated his intention to leave the show to John Sullivan. This would have resulted in a spin-off entitled "Hot-Rod" with Rodney and Mickey Pearce taking over Trotters Independent Traders, as well as featuring all the other regular Only Fools and Horses cast members, and an option of Del returning at a later date. However, in the end, Jason changed his mind and decided to stay on, and Sullivan had to change the ending so that Del turns down Jumbo's offer.

References

External links

Only Fools and Horses (series 5) episodes
1986 British television episodes